Debt level is a measure of how much debt is outstanding. Debt flow is a measure of debt level changes over time. Both are basic macroeconomic variables. Debt is used to finance household consumptions, businesses, and government spendings. Within mainstream economics, the levels and flows of public debt (government debt) are seen as a larger cause of concern than those associated with private debt.

Measuring debt 

In measuring debt, stocks and flows are both of interest: stocks are amounts, levels of debt (e.g., $100) and have units of currency (such as US Dollars), while flows are changes in levels – in calculus terms, the derivative – (e.g., $10/year), and have units of currency/time (such as US Dollars/Year).

In order to make these stock and flows comparable between countries and across time, one may normalize these by some measure of the size of the country's economy, most often GDP, that is, compute the debt to GDP ratio. For instance, $10 billion in 2000 is a small amount of debt relative to the size of the economy of the United States, but large relative to the size of the economy of Iceland, and dividing by the GDP reflects this.

Because GDP is generally quoted with units of currency/year, and debt levels have units of currency, the debt level/GDP ratio has units of years, which may be interpreted as "how many years it would take to repay the debt if all income went to debt repayment". In practice this cannot happen – some of GDP must go to survival – and historically debt repayment rates during periods of repayment have been about 4%–10% of GDP (as in the United States during the Great Depression and World War II), so practical time to repay debt is rather Debt/GDP times 10–25.

Overall levels 
Debt levels are worth 3 years of GDP in many countries that have an annual GDP/person above $10,000. Worldwide debt levels are perhaps worth two or three years of GDP. GDP (at currency exchange rate) was $40 trillion during 2004. Debt levels may therefore be about $100 trillion.

$5.7 trillion of gross debt was issued in 2004 according to Thomson Financial numbers, while GDP grew $4 trillion (currency exchange rate). That does not mean that net debt grew faster than GDP on a worldwide average (even if it has done so for years after 2001 in the USA), as debt issuance may be refinancing of existing debt, often "rolling over" debt that comes due into new debt. When debt matures new debt is many times issued to repay the old debt, perhaps from the same creditor. That is one reason why debt issuance far surpasses equity issuance in currency value.

Debt is often issued with a repayment plan (a "time to maturity" in some cases), repayment times may be between a few days (interbank cash flow management) and 50 years or longer (consumer real estate debt). The average repayment time of all worldwide outstanding debt is perhaps 10 years.

Equity is another way of financing business, as it has no set time to maturity and pays no set interest. It pays profit from the company it has a claim on.

Accounting
All credit is debt, a liability. Debt is created by lenders and borrowers agreeing to exchange the use of money for the promise to repay. The unit of money lent is the asset of the creditor and the liability of the debtor.

Notes are paper with terms of exchange, hence credits or access to money. All currencies are notes ("This note is legal tender for..."). Money is based on a fiat whereupon all agree upon the exchange values of any one currency for another. This extends to savings and checking accounts which are depository receipts for money loaned to bankers who in turn lend it to other borrowers. And thus it multiplies, a deposit becomes a loan that becomes another deposit and so on.

The terms of the lending agreement are the key elements of the contractual terms of a promissory note regarding repayment including the amount(s) loaned and to be repaid, loan fees, time value and risk value interest charges, due dates, balloon payments, default terms and more. All material information should be disclosed on financial statements or footnotes.

Flows

2004
Worldwide debt and equity underwriting reached a record $5.69 trillion. Worldwide debt underwriting grew 4.3% year-over-year to $5.19 trillion. Syndicated lending was up 34.3% year-over-year. Worldwide high-yield corporate debt climbed to over $163 billion eclipsing the previous record of $150 billion set in 1998. US Asset-backed securities volume increased 41.7% to $857 billion.

Worldwide equity & equity-related issuance totaled $505bn for the year, representing a 29.9% increase over the $389bn raised in 2003. Initial public offerings increased nearly 220%.

2003
Worldwide Debt, Equity and Equity-related issuance reached record-breaking levels with over $5 trillion in proceeds raised, surpassing 2001's record of $4.4 trillion. The $5 trillion of borrowings represented 14% of the GDP flow during the year (4.938/36.3) (see world economy). 93% of the issuance was debt, 7% was equity. Note that these numbers don't include all mortgage borrowing, which was $3.8 trillion in the United States during 2003. $900 billion of it is in mortgage-backed securities, at least $546 billion in US Federal Credit Agency.

Flows
Flows mean issued and sold debt. Debt and equity issuance reported by Thomson Financial ($ billions and number of issues).

Worldwide Debt, Equity & Equity-related
2004: 5,693 (20,066) (Q4 2004 report)
2003: 5,326 (19,706) (Q4 2003 report)
2002: 4,257 (?) (Q4 2003 report)

Worldwide Disclosed Fees
2004: 15.401 (6,890) (Q4 2004 report)
2003: 14.461 (8,023) (Q4 2003 report)
2002: 14.762 (6,696) (Q4 2003 report)

Worldwide Equity and Equity-related
2004: 505 (3,628) (Q4 2004 report)
2003: 388 (2,418) (Q4 2003 report)
2002: 319 (?) (Q4 2003 report)

Worldwide Debt
2004: 5,187 (16,439) (Q4 2004 report)
2003: 4,938 (17,287) (Q4 2003 report)
2002: 3,938 (?) (Q4 2003 report)

Worldwide High Yield Corporate Debt
2004: 163 (606) (Q4 2004 report)
2003: 146 (524) (Q4 2003 report)
2002: 63 (?) (Q4 2003 report)

Worldwide Loans (syndicated, leveraged)
2004: 2,640 (7,147) (Q4 2004 report)
2003: 1,966 (?) (Q4 2004 report)
2002: ? (?) (Q4 2003 report)

Europe
All Euromarket Issues
2003: 1,397 (3,568) (Q4 2003 report)
2002: 877 (2715) (Q4 2002 report)

European Leveraged Loans
2003: 107 (222) (Q4 2003 report)
2002: ? (?) (Q4 2002 report)

United States

US Investment grade
2003: 659 (1,868) (Q4 2003 report)
2002: 549 (?) (Q4 2003 report)

All US Federal Credit Agency Debt. FHLB dominated the agency market in 2003, raising $545.5 billion in proceeds, a 35% increase in volume from 2002.
2003: 1,191 (13,152) (Q4 2003 report)
2003: 923 (?) (Q4 2003 report)

US Mortgage-backed Securities
2003: 900 (1,203) (Q4 2003 report)
2002: 805 (?) (Q4 2003 report)

US Asset-backed securities
2003: 581 (1,175) (Q4 2003 report)
2002: 456 (?) (Q4 2003 report)

US Syndicated Loans
2003: 980 (2,962) (Q4 2003 report)
2002: 1,051 (?) (Q4 2003 report)

US Leveraged Loans
2003: 368 (1,549) (Q4 2003 report)
2002: 344 (?) (Q4 2003 report)

Levels
Levels mean market or balance sheet liability of borrowing party (or asset of lending party) value. Numbers are end-of-year levels, unless otherwise stated.

Euro area
Credit market debt
2003: ?
Households
2004: 86% of households’ gross disposable income
Non-financial corporations
2003: 78.9% of GDP
Government
2003: 70.7% of GDP

Japan
Credit market debt
2003: ?
Households
2003: 110.5% of households’ gross disposable income
Non-financial corporations
2003: 110.5% of GDP
Government
2003: 141.3% of GDP

United States

Dollar amounts are debt owed by each sector (amounts borrowed by each sector)

Credit market debt
2008/Q1: $49.6 trillion (349% of GDP) 
Household sector
2008/Q1: $13,959.9 billion (99% of GDP) (% of "households’ gross disposable income") 
Domestic Financial sectors
2008/Q1: $15.9 trillion (112% of GDP)
Nonfinancial corporate business
2008/Q1: $6.474 trillion (46% of GDP "Non-financial corporations") 
Nonfarm noncorporate business
2003: $2.241 trillion
Farm business
2003: $208 billion
Government
2008/Q1: $7.470 trillion (52.6% of GDP "Government") 
Federal government
2008/Q1: $5.244 trillion
State and local governments
2008/Q1: $2.226 trillion

See also
Bond (finance)
Bond market
Economic bubble
Debt (loan, credit)
Debt market (credit market)
Equity market
Fixed income
Government debt
Securitization
Structured finance
World economy

Specific:
Eurodad
Thomson Financial league tables

References

External links
 Eurodad: Illegitimate debt, debt cancellation, responsible lending and multilateral debt

International

Thomson Financial
Thomson - Financial - League Tables

Europe

ECB
ECB: Statistics
ECB: Statistics pocket book

United States
Outstanding Public and Private Bond Market Debt

Federal Reserve
FRB: Z.1 Release-- Flow of Funds Accounts of the United States, Release Dates
FRB: Z.1 Release--L.1--Credit Market Debt Outstanding
FRB: Z.1 Release--F.6--Distribution of Gross Domestic Product

Levels and Flows
Financial economics
Macroeconomic indicators